"Love Is All We Need" is a song by American singer Mary J. Blige, with a guest rap from Nas. It was written by Blige, James Harris III, Terry Lewis, and Nasir Jones for Blige's third studio album, Share My World (1997), while production was helmed by Jimmy Jam & Terry Lewis. The song contains a sample of the song "Moonchild" (1985) by American singer Rick James.  With its more buoyant tone, "Love Is All We Need" stood in conspicuous contrast to much of the more dark-rooted material featured on Blige's earlier albums.

Release
While well received in America as an airplay single, the song was never given a physical release in the US and as a result the song never charted on the Hot 100 singles chart, though it did reach number one on the US dance singles chart. Meanwhile, the song became an international hit reaching number fifteen on the UK singles charts; Blige's first top twenty UK hit since 1995's "Mary Jane (All Night Long)." A remix of the song features a separate rap cameo by Foxy Brown and a vocal interpolation of Diana Ross' "Do You Know Where You're Going To (Theme from Mahogany)".

Critical reception
Jonathan Bernstein from Entertainment Weekly noted "the exultant way Blige reacts to the whomping drums, vast chorus, and wide-screen production Jimmy Jam and Terry Lewis cook up" on "Love Is All We Need". Pan-European magazine Music & Media stated that here, "Ms. Blige proves that she has matured as an artist to the extent that she now can be regarded as one of the leading artists in the R&B field. This midtempo song is a fine example of this. The icing on the cake is provided by an imaginative rap by Nas and a sample of Rick James' Moonchild." 

Music Week rated the song three out of five, describing it as a "lively, funky track featuring rapper Nas and a tasty Rick James sample." A reviewer from People Magazine viewed it as "brilliantly produced" and "a muscular ode to the power of commitment." The reviewer added, "With rapper Nas adding encouragement, Mary J. dives deep into the song’s dense grooves with a tone that’s alternately raw and rugged and then as clear as a spring day. Like much of this excellent CD, it’s a perfect blend of attitude and straight-up skill."

Music video
The accompanying music video for the song was shot in New York City on February 24–25, 1997. Blige is shown at an office singing, and then at a fashion show. Nas is in a fancy chair rapping his verse. The final scene shows Blige on top of a building.

Track listings

 CD 1

 "Love Is All We Need" (Album Version)
 "Love Is All We Need" (Instant Flava Remix)
 "Love Is All We Need" (Mark's Needy Vocal)
 "Love Is All We Need" (DYMK Club Mix)

 CD 2

 "Love Is All We Need" (Cutfather & Joe Remix)
 "Love Is All We Need" (Cutfather & Joe Stripped Down Mix)
 "Love Is All We Need" (Elusive Club Mix)
 "Love Is All We Need" (Mark!s Faster Mary Faster Dub)
 "Love Is All We Need" (Hard On Dub)

 Cassette

 "Love Is All We Need" (Album Version)
 "Love Is All We Need" (Cutfather & Joe Remix)

Credits and personnel
Credits adapted from the Share My World liner notes.
 Mary J. Blige – lead vocals, background vocals
 LaTonya Blige-DaCosta – background vocals
 Nas – additional vocals
 Jimmy Jam & Terry Lewis – production

Charts

Weekly charts

Year-end charts

References

1997 singles
1997 songs
Mary J. Blige songs
MCA Records singles
Music videos directed by Paul Hunter (director)
Nas songs
Songs written by Jimmy Jam and Terry Lewis
Songs written by Mary J. Blige
Songs written by Rick James
Song recordings produced by Jimmy Jam and Terry Lewis